Major General Guy Payan Dawnay,  (23 March 1878 – 19 January 1952) was a British Army officer and merchant banker. He was the nephew of Guy Dawnay, a politician.

Career
Dawnay was commissioned a second lieutenant in the Coldstream Guards on 20 May 1899, and promoted to lieutenant on 10 July 1900. He served in South Africa during the Second Boer War, where he was a staff officer as Aide-de-camp to Major-General Bruce Hamilton, in command in Eastern Transvaal. For his service in the war, he was appointed a Companion of the Distinguished Service Order (DSO) in the October 1902 South African honours list.

During the First World War Dawnay was assigned to the General Staff of the Mediterranean Expeditionary Force and fought at the Gallipoli campaign during the First World War. Following the withdrawal from Gallipoli he was shifted to the headquarters of the newly formed Egyptian Expeditionary Force. When the corp-sized Eastern Force was created under Lieutenant-General Charles Dobell in September 1916 to command operations in the Sinai, Dawnay was assigned as Chief of Staff (Brigadier General, General Staff). He continued as Chief of Staff to Dobell's successor Philip Chetwode until August 1917 when he became Deputy Chief of Staff of the Egyptian Expeditionary Force, still with the rank of the Brigadier-General.

Following the Battle of Jerusalem Dawnay was transferred to the General Headquarters of the British Expeditionary Force in France with a promotion to Major General. As head of the Staff Duties Section of the General Staff he was responsible for training, organization, anti-aircraft defence, and censorship and publicity.

In 1909 whilst a student at the Army Staff College at Camberley he co-founded the Chatham Dining Club with Rupert Ommanney. In 1928 he founded Dawnay Day, an investment company together with Julian Day.

References

External links
 Oxford Dictionary of National Biography (requires login)

1878 births
1952 deaths
British Army generals of World War I
British Army personnel of the Second Boer War
British businesspeople
Companions of the Distinguished Service Order
Companions of the Order of St Michael and St George
Companions of the Order of the Bath
Coldstream Guards officers
Recipients of the Legion of Honour
Members of the Royal Victorian Order
Recipients of the Distinguished Service Medal (US Army)
Recipients of the Order of Saints Maurice and Lazarus
Recipients of the Order of St. Anna
Guy
British Army major generals
Foreign recipients of the Distinguished Service Medal (United States)